Whitney Houston is the debut studio album by American singer Whitney Houston, released on February 14, 1985, by Arista Records. The album initially had a slow commercial response but began getting more popular in mid-1985. It eventually topped the Billboard 200 for 14 weeks in 1986, generating three number-one singles — "Saving All My Love for You", "How Will I Know" and "Greatest Love of All" (a cover of "The Greatest Love of All", originally recorded in 1977 by George Benson) — on the Billboard Hot 100, which made it both the first debut album and the first album by a solo female artist to produce three number-one singles.

The album topped the albums charts in many countries, including Canada, Australia, Norway, and Sweden, while peaking at number 2 in the United Kingdom, Germany, and Switzerland. The album was certified diamond for shipments of 10 million units or more on March 16, 1999, and later 14× Platinum by the Recording Industry Association of America on January 27, 2023. With sales of over 25 million copies worldwide, Whitney Houston is one of the best selling albums of all time.

In 1986, at the 28th Grammy Awards, Whitney Houston received four nominations, including Album of the Year, and won one, Best Pop Vocal Performance, Female, for "Saving All My Love for You". For the 29th Grammy Awards of 1987, the album earned one nomination for Record of the Year for "Greatest Love of All". The album has ranked on Rolling Stone magazine's list of the 500 Greatest Albums of All Time in all three editions.

In honor of its 25th anniversary, the album was reissued as Whitney Houston – The Deluxe Anniversary Edition on January 26, 2010, an expanded edition with five bonus tracks including the a cappella version of "How Will I Know" that original 12-inch remixes, a booklet on the history of the original album, along with a DVD of live performances and interviews by Whitney Houston and Clive Davis. On June 30, 2020, after the 35th anniversary celebration in February 2020, the album re-issued as a double vinyl including the singles from Whitney Dancin' Special. Also, they released a box set including the 40-page hard cover photo and lyric book.

Background

After seeing Houston perform in a New York City nightclub, Clive Davis believed the singer had the potential to crossover and be the next big superstar. He signed her in 1983 and the two began work on her debut album. Initially Davis had a hard time finding songs for her. Even after elaborate showcases in New York and Los Angeles, many producers turned down the chance to work with her. It took a year and a half for Jerry Griffith, then-Arista's A&R chief and the one who had recommended Houston to Davis, and Davis to amass suitable songs for the album. Finally the songwriter-producer Kashif offered to produce "You Give Good Love". Jermaine Jackson, who had emerged from the shadow of his younger brother Michael, produced three songs. Narada Michael Walden revised and then produced "How Will I Know".  Michael Masser covered the pop side of the tracks, producing four of his own compositions, including "Saving All My Love for You" and "Greatest Love of All", which had originally been recorded in 1977 by George Benson as "The Greatest Love of All", and was the main theme of the 1977 Muhammad Ali biopic The Greatest. After two years of recording, the album was ready for release. Budgeted at $200,000, it finally cost almost $400,000.

Critical reception

Whitney Houston received generally positive response from critics with praise for Houston's vocal prowess, although some criticism of the album's pop formulaic nature. In a positive review for The New York Times, Stephen Holden wrote, "along with an appealing romantic innocence, [Houston] projects the commanding dignity and elegance of someone far more mature." Liam Lacey of The Globe and Mail said the "arrangements frequently border on formulaic but such ballads as "Saving All My Love for You", "Greatest Love of All," and "Hold Me" are some of the loveliest pop singing on vinyl since the glory days of Dionne Warwick." Lacey added, "Houston has a silky, rich, vibrant voice that moves between steely edges, or curls sensuously around the notes." Los Angeles Times complimented Houston on her excellent vocal ability, writing, "neither the frequently listless arrangements nor the sometimes mediocre material of this debut LP hides the fact that Houston is a singer with enormous power and potential" on their reviews for 1985's releases.

Don Shewey of Rolling Stone described her as "one of the most exciting new voices in years" and stated that: "Because she has a technically polished voice like Patti Austin's, [...] her interpretive approach is what sets her apart" and "Whitney Houston is obviously headed for stardom, and if nothing else, her album is an exciting preview of coming attractions." But he expressed a little disappointment about undistinguished pop-soul tunes, commenting "many of the songs here are so featureless they could be sung by anyone. They make what could have been a stunning debut merely promising." In his consumer guide for The Village Voice, Robert Christgau complimented Houston's "sweet, statuesque voice", but called the songs "schlock" and believed "only one of the four producers puts any zip in—Narada Michael Walden, who goes one for one."

Stephen Thomas Erlewine from AllMusic defined Whitney Houston as "the foundation of diva-pop" and stated that certainly, the ballads such as "Greatest Love of All" and "Saving All My Love for You", provided "the blueprint for decades of divas". However, he gave higher marks to the lighter tracks like "How Will I Know" and "Thinking About You", commenting these tracks "are what really impresses some 20-plus years on" and "turns the album into a fully rounded record, the rare debut that manages to telegraph every aspect of an artist's career in a mere ten songs." Brad Wete, on a feature article to celebrate for Vibe magazine's 15th anniversary in September 2008, wrote "never before has an African-American woman earned such crossover appeal so early in her career. [...] [Houston] had an explosive solo debut" and commented "Whitney's prodigious pop set [...] was a fresh serving of precocious talent compared to 1985's mildly flavored R&B buffet." Allison Stewart from The Washington Post stated that the album "provided a blueprint for the pop/dance/R&B-melding careers of Mariah Carey and others, and introduced the world to "The Voice", an octave-spanning, gravity-defying melismatic marvel." In The New Rolling Stone Album Guide (2004), music journalist J. D. Considine gave the album three out of five stars and stated, "Although utterly calculating, Whitney Houston does have its moments, particularly when Houston leans toward R&B, as on 'You Give Good Love.'"

Commercial performance
Released on February 14, 1985, Whitney Houston debuted on the Billboard Top Albums Chart the week of March 30, 1985, at number 166. Sales were low initially. However, with the success of the first single "You Give Good Love", the album began climbing the charts and finally reached the number one on the Billboard Top Black Albums chart in June and the top 10 on the Billboard 200 (formerly "Top Pop Albums") in August 1985. After 55 weeks, successive hit singles and Grammy wins led to the album eventually topping the Billboard 200 album chart in March 1986. It was the slowest climb to the top of the charts since Fleetwood Mac took 58 weeks to reach the top in 1976.

Whitney Houston spent 14 non-consecutive weeks at the top of Billboard 200 chart from March until late June 1986, which was short of one week for Carole King's record of 15 weeks for the longest running No. 1 album by a female artist at the time. It was the second-longest running No.1 album among the debut albums in Billboard history, behind Men at Work's Business as Usual, which had 15 weeks on top in 1982–83. The album remained on the Billboard 200 for 162 weeks. It also spent a 46 weeks in the top 10, equaling Carole King's record with Tapestry; this record was broken in the 1990s. Houston's debut was the best-selling album of 1986 in the United States and the No. 1 album of the year on 1986 Billboard year-end charts, making her the first female artist to earn that distinction. She became also the number 1 pop artist of the year, according to Billboard. The RIAA certified it Diamond on March 16, 1999, and later 14× platinum on January 27, 2023, for shipments of 14,000,000 copies of the album in United States.

The album was successful worldwide. In the United Kingdom, it peaked at number two on the albums chart, spending 119 weeks on the chart. It was certified 4× platinum for shipments of 1,200,000 units of the album by the British Phonographic Industry(BPI), becoming the fifth best-selling album of 1986. In Canada, the album reached the top spot on the albums chart and remained there for 17 weeks to become the longest stay at the summit by a female artist. On March 31, 1987, it was certified 10× platinum for sales of over one million copies, making it the best-selling album of 1986, and later Diamond by the Canadian Recording Industry Association(CRIA). Whitney Houston was also the 1986's top selling album in Australia, staying at number one of the Kent Music Report albums chart for 11 weeks, the longest stay by a female artist at the time. It became the first time an African American artist had a number 1 album in Australia. In Japan, the album was ranked number two on list of the 1986's best-selling album by a foreign artist, with a total of 450,000 units combined sales of LP, CD and Compact Cassette, only behind Madonna's True Blue. Besides, the album reached the number one on the albums chart in Norway for ten weeks, Sweden for six weeks and South Africa for five weeks, the number two in Germany, Switzerland, and the number three in Austria and New Zealand. Worldwide, Whitney Houston has sold over 25 million copies, becoming one of the best selling albums in the 1980s. According to the Nielsen SoundScan began tracking sales data in 1991, as of 2009, the album sold over 1,038,000 copies in the United States.

The week ending of February 25, 2012, following Houston's death on February 11, the album re-charted on the Billboard 200 at No. 72 with 8,000 copies sold.

Legacy
Whitney Houston was the first album by a female artist to be number 1 on the Billboard Year End Albums Charts of 1986. According to Consequence of Sound, the album reached a massive level of cross-over that was unprecedented at the time for a black female music artist. It was the first album by a black female artist to reach No. 1 in Australia when it topped the charts for 11 consecutive weeks. Billboard picked the enormous success of her debut album release on the charts as one of 110 Musical Milestones in its history. It was also the first album by a black female artist to top the year-end charts in Australia and Canada and only the second to top the year-end chart in Switzerland after Tina Turner's Private Dancer, and, at 25 million copies worldwide, remains the best-selling studio album by a black female artist of all time.

Accolades

At the 28th Grammy Awards in 1986, Whitney Houston received four nominations—Album of the Year, Best Female Pop Vocal Performance for "Saving All My Love for You", Best Female R&B Vocal Performance for "You Give Good Love" and Best Rhythm & Blues Song for "You Give Good Love"—and won Houston's first Grammy, Best Pop Vocal Performance, Female. In addition, the album earned one nomination for Record of the Year in 1987 for "Greatest Love of All", a cover of "The Greatest Love of All", originally recorded by George Benson in 1977, ten years before and was the main theme of the boxer Muhammad Ali biopic "The Greatest" in the same year.

The album received good response from major publications. Three major critics of the Los Angeles Times listed the album on their year end critics list. The album ranked No. 79 on Robert Hilburn's list, No. 2 on Paul Grein's list and No. 5 on Dennis Hunt's list. In November 2003, the album was ranked No. 254 on Rolling Stones publication of the 500 greatest albums of all time, and 257 in a 2012 revised list. Then ranked 249 in a 2020 revised list It also ranked No. 46 on the Rock and Roll Hall of Fame's Definitive 200 List in 2007. In addition, ranked No. 71 on Q magazine's "100 Women Who Rock The World" in 2002 and No. 15 on Yahoo! Music's 30 Most Significant Albums In Black Music History list in 2010, with Brandy's comments on the album; "The first Whitney Houston CD was genius. That CD introduced the world to her angelic yet powerful voice. Without Whitney many of this generation of singers wouldn't be singing." In 2013, the album was inducted into the Grammy Hall of Fame. In 2018, Pitchfork placed Whitney Houston at number 117 on their newly revised list of "200 Best Albums of the 1980s".

Best New Artist controversy
Although the album was nominated in four categories at the 28th Grammy Awards, Houston was not nominated for Best New Artist that year due to National Academy of Recording Arts and Sciences (NARAS) regulations, which caused some controversy. Although Whitney Houston was Houston's debut album, she was disqualified as a new artist because she had been credited in 1984 as a guest vocalist on the Jermaine Jackson album Dynamite as well as the Teddy Pendergrass album Love Language. Per NARAS rules, any previous album credit disqualifies an artist from the Best New Artist award.

Clive Davis, then the president of Arista Records, sent a letter of complaint to NARAS president Michael Greene disputing the disqualification. He also wrote to Billboard magazine, noting that the rule had been applied much less strictly in previous years. According to Davis, artists including Cyndi Lauper, Luther Vandross, the Power Station, Carly Simon, and Crosby, Stills & Nash, had already received credits on other albums or been previously well known as a member of other acts prior to their nominations for the Best New Artist award. He referred to the disqualification as "a conspicuous injustice".

Despite the criticism, NARAS did not back down from the disqualification. Greene, in a statement, said that "The determination of eligibility or ineligibility in the best new artist category is not made capriciously or taken lightly." He also noted that the duets with Jackson and Pendergrass had been submitted for consideration for the 27th Grammy Awards, which he said "was sufficient to make her ineligible this year for best new artist according to academy criteria." The 1986 award eventually went to British band Sade.

American singer Richard Marx was similarly ruled ineligible for nomination as Best New Artist in 1988. In an interview with Orange Coast magazine, he referred to the Houston controversy, saying "I don't have a lot of respect for N.A.R.A.S., the Grammy people's ruling system, because it's so inconsistent. They deemed me and Whitney Houston ineligible, and yet they nominated Jody Watley, who made records with Shalamar." In 2000, Geoff Mayfield of Billboard magazine also criticized NARAS for inconsistency with the Best New Artist rules, specifically referencing their disqualification of Houston and nomination of Watley.

Singles
The label, wanting Houston to have a solid urban fanbase first, released "You Give Good Love" as the first single. The soulful ballad would top the R&B chart and surprise the label by crossing over and reaching number three on the pop chart while the singer was playing at nightclubs in the United States. The jazzy-pop "Saving All My Love for You" (originally a minor hit for Marilyn McCoo and Billy Davis Jr. in 1978 on their album Marilyn & Billy) was released next and really put her on the map. The single was an even bigger success hitting number one on the Billboard Hot 100 chart. It would reach number one in the United Kingdom and was successful around the world. With her first number one, Houston began appearing on high-profile talk shows and became the opening act for Jeffrey Osborne and Luther Vandross. "Thinking About You" was released as the single only to R&B-oriented radio stations. It peaked at number 10 on the Hot Black Singles chart and at number 24 on the Hot Dance/Disco Club Play chart.

At the end of 1985, "How Will I Know" was released as the official third single. With its colorful and energetic video, the song brought the singer to the teen audience and MTV, which black artists had found tough to crack. It became another number one single for Houston, topping both the Billboard Hot 100 Singles chart and Hot Black Singles chart. The final single, "Greatest Love of All", a cover of "The Greatest Love of All", originally recorded in 1977 by George Benson, become the biggest hit off the album with a three-week stay atop the Hot 100. As a result, the parent album became the first debut album—and the first album by a female artist—ever to generate three number one singles. With "Greatest Love of All" and Houston's debut album both at No. 1 on the singles and albums chart respectively, she became the first female artist to have the number one pop single and album simultaneously since Kim Carnes in 1981 with "Bette Davis Eyes" and Mistaken Identity. "All at Once" was released only to Adult Contemporary and Urban AC stations as a radio airplay-only single later in 1986. It received heavy airplay and can still be heard on AC stations. However, the single received an official release in Japan and many European countries. "Take Good Care of my Heart" (as a duet with Jermaine Jackson) was also released as a promotional single in Panama.

Promotion and appearances

Tours

To further promote her debut album and first US top 5 Pop and No. 1 R&B single "You Give Good Love", Houston went on tour performing at clubs, theaters and festivals. By August 1985, she was featured as a support act at selected dates on individual tours by singers Luther Vandross and Jeffrey Osborne. The following summer of 1986, her album generated three US Hot 100 chart toppers; Houston embarked on The Greatest Love Tour performing shows in North America, Europe, and Japan.

Track listing

Personnel

Whitney Houston – lead vocals
Jermaine Jackson – duet vocals
Teddy Pendergrass – duet vocals
Premik Russell Tubbs – saxophone
Tom Scott - saxophone ("Saving All My Love for You")
John Barnes – clarinet and keyboards
Robbie Buchanan – keyboards
Randy Kerber – keyboards
Yvonne Lewis – keyboards
Richard Marx – keyboards, background vocals
Nathan East – bass
Freddie Washington – bass
Randy Jackson – bass
Preston Glass – synthesizer
Greg Phillinganes – synthesizer
Ed Greene – drums
John "J.R." Robinson – drums
J.T. Lewis – drums
Steve Rucker – drums
Paul Leim – drums
Cissy Houston – background vocals
Julia Tillman Waters – background vocals
 Maxine Willard Waters – background vocals
Oren Waters – background vocals
Yogi Lee – background vocals
Mary Canty – background vocals
Deborah Thomas – background vocals
Paul Jackson, Jr. – guitar
Dann Huff – guitar
Tim May – guitar
Ira Siegel – guitar
David Williams – guitar
Louie Shelton – guitar
Corrado Rustici – guitar
Jermaine Jackson – producer, background vocals
Michael Masser – producer
Clive Davis – executive producer
Michael Barbiero – mixing, engineer
Michael Mancini – engineer
Michael O'Reilly – mixing, engineer
Russell Schmitt – engineer
Bill Schnee – mixing
Gene Page Jr. – arrangements
Kashif – arrangements, producer, background vocals
Narada Michael Walden – arrangements, producer
Donn Davenport – art direction
Garry Gross – photographer
Tiagi Lambert – fashion stylist
Giovanne De Maura – gown
Norma Kamali - bathing suit
Quietfire – makeup
Brenda Gorsky – coordinator
Jeffrey Woodly – hair stylist

Charts

Weekly charts

Year-end charts

Decade-end charts

All-time charts

Certifications and sales

See also
List of best-selling albums
 List of best-selling albums by women
List of best-selling albums in the United States
List of Top 40 albums for 1980–1989 in Australia
List of diamond-certified albums in Canada

References

Further reading

External links
 Whitney Houston at Discogs
 Whitney Houston at MusicBrainz
 Accolades: Whitney Houston at Acclaimed Music
 The 25 Best-Selling Albums of All-Time: Whitney Houston  at Entertainment Weekly

Whitney Houston albums
1985 debut albums
Albums arranged by Gene Page
Albums produced by Michael Masser
Albums produced by Narada Michael Walden
Arista Records albums